Georgia competed at the 2020 Summer Olympics in Tokyo. Originally scheduled to take place from 24 July to 9 August 2020, the Games were postponed to 23 July to 8 August 2021, because of the COVID-19 pandemic. It was the nation's seventh consecutive appearance at the Summer Olympics in the post-Soviet era.

Medalists

Competitors
The following is the list of number of competitors participating in the Games:

Athletics

Georgian athletes further achieved the entry standards, either by qualifying time or by world ranking, in the following track and field events (up to a maximum of 3 athletes in each event):

Field events

Boxing

Georgia entered three male boxers into the Olympic tournament for the first time in 12 years. 2019 European Games silver medalist Sakhil Alakhverdovi (men's flyweight), Eskerkhan Madiev (men's welterweight), and Giorgi Kharabadze (men's middleweight) secured the spots on the Georgian squad in their respective weight divisions, either by winning the round of 16 match, advancing to the semifinal match, or scoring a box-off triumph, at the 2020 European Qualification Tournament in London and Paris.

Fencing

Georgia entered one fencer into the Olympic competition. Rio 2016 Olympian Sandro Bazadze claimed a spot in the men's sabre as one of the two highest-ranked fencers vying for qualification from Europe in the FIE Adjusted Official Rankings.

Gymnastics

Rhythmic
Georgia entered one gymnasts to compete at the Olympics, after get the allocation quota at the 2019 Rhythmic Gymnastics World Championships in Baku, Azerbaijan.

Judo
 
Georgia entered nine judoka (seven men and two women) into the Olympic tournament based on the International Judo Federation Olympics Individual Ranking.

Men

Women

Karate
 
Georgia entered one karateka into the inaugural Olympic tournament. Gogita Arkania qualified directly for the men's kumite +75 kg category by finishing top three at 2021 World Olympic Qualification Tournament in Paris, France.

Kumite

Shooting

Georgian shooters achieved quota places for the following events by virtue of their best finishes at the 2018 ISSF World Championships, the 2019 ISSF World Cup series, European Championships or Games, and European Qualifying Tournament, as long as they obtained a minimum qualifying score (MQS) by May 31, 2020.

Swimming

Tennis

At the conclusion of the qualification period for the Olympic tennis tournament and after some withdrawals, the following players had qualified for the competition by means of rankings.

Weightlifting

Georgia qualified four male weightlifters for each of the following classes into the Olympic competition. Shota Mishvelidze (men's 61 kg), Anton Pliesnoi (men's 96 kg), and reigning Olympic champion Lasha Talakhadze (men's +109 kg) secured one of the top eight slots each in their respective weight divisions based on the IWF Absolute World Ranking, with Goga Chkheidze (men's 67 kg) topping the list of weightlifters from Europe in the men's 67 kg division of the IWF Absolute Continental Ranking.

Wrestling

Georgia qualified seven wrestlers for each of the following classes into the Olympic competition. Four of them finished among the top six to book Olympic spots  in the men's freestyle (97 and 125 kg) and men's Greco-Roman (97 and 130 kg) wrestling at the 2019 World Championships, while three additional licenses were awarded to the Georgian wrestlers, who progressed to the top two finals of their respective weight categories at the 2021 European Olympic Qualification Tournament in Budapest, Hungary.

Freestyle

Greco-Roman

See also
 Georgia at the 2020 Summer Paralympics

References

Nations at the 2020 Summer Olympics
2020
2021 in Georgian sport